Čabar is a town in Primorje-Gorski Kotar County in western Croatia. There are 3,770 inhabitants (census 2011), in the following settlements:

 Bazli, population 5
 Brinjeva Draga, population 5
 Crni Lazi, population 117
 Čabar, population 412
 Donji Žagari, population 8
 Fažonci, population 0
 Ferbežari, population 32
 Gerovo, population 689
 Gerovski Kraj, population 95
 Gorači, population 99
 Gornji Žagari, population 83
 Hrib, population 109
 Kamenski Hrib, population 6
 Kozji Vrh, population 60
 Kraljev Vrh, population 14
 Kranjci, population 4
 Lautari, population 16
 Lazi, population 55
 Makov Hrib, population 103
 Mali Lug, population 79
 Mandli, population 39
 Okrivje, population 2
 Parg, population 87
 Plešce, population 140
 Podstene, population 17
 Požarnica, population 1
 Prezid, population 740
 Prhci, population 12
 Prhutova Draga, population 3
 Pršleti, population 0
 Ravnice, population 39
 Selo, population 41
 Smrečje, population 71
 Smrekari, population 9
 Sokoli, population 10
 Srednja Draga, population 43
 Tropeti, population 12
 Tršće, population 342
 Vode, population 35
 Vrhovci, population 110
 Zamost, population 26

In the same census, 94.6% of the population were Croats, 2.3% Slovenes and 1.1% Serbs.

Name
Čabar is known as Čeber in the local dialect. The name is believed to derive from the Illyrian word ziaber 'clearing'.

History
In the late 19th and early 20th century, Čabar was a district capital in the Modruš-Rijeka County of the Kingdom of Croatia-Slavonia.

Twin towns

Čabar is twinned with:
 Pula, Croatia (since 1974)

References

External links
City of Čabar Municipality web Portal

Cities and towns in Croatia
Populated places in Primorje-Gorski Kotar County
Modruš-Rijeka County